The Judo competition in the 1990 Goodwill Games were held in Seattle, United States 2 and 3 August 1990.

Medal overview

Men's events

Women's events

Medals table

External links
Result of the Judo at the 1990 Goodwill Games(Goodwill Games)

1990 Goodwill Games
1990
G
Judo competitions in the United States